Lance Irvin is an American college basketball coach, formerly head coach of the Chicago State Cougars men's basketball team.

Playing career
Irvin played college basketball at Colorado State during the 1987–88 season before transferring to Idaho where he played under Larry Eustachy from 1990 to 1991.

Coaching career
Serving as a graduate assistant under Eustachy at Idaho, Irvin got his first coaching opportunity. He then returned home to his native Chicago as an assistant coach at DePaul from 1992 to 1997, followed by an assistant coaching stint at Loyola-Chicago from 1998 to 2001 before reuniting with Eustachy at Iowa State for one season. In 2002, Irvin joined the coaching staff at Illinois State, and made subsequent stops at Texas A&M and Missouri under Melvin Watkins and Quin Snyder respectively. After Missouri, Irvin became an assistant coach at SMU from 2006 to 2008, and then an assistant at Southern Illinois from 2008 to 2012.

Irvin returned home to Chicago and assisted his brother Nick coaching the Morgan Park HS boys basketball team, while also serving as the school's dean of students.

On August 7, 2018, Irvin was named the 13th head men's basketball coach in Chicago State history, replacing Tracy Dildy.

Personal life
Irvin is part of a prominent Chicago basketball family. His late father McGlother "Mac" Irvin is the founder of the Mac Irvin Fire AAU program. Brother Byron is a former NBA first round draft choice and three seasons in the NBA with the Portland Trail Blazers and Washington Bullets, while brothers Mac, Nick and sister Cynthia have all been involved in the Chicago basketball scene.

Head coaching record

Notes

References

Living people
American men's basketball coaches
American men's basketball players
Basketball coaches from Illinois
Basketball players from Illinois
Chicago State Cougars men's basketball coaches
Colorado State Rams men's basketball players
DePaul Blue Demons men's basketball coaches
High school basketball coaches in the United States
Idaho Vandals men's basketball coaches
Idaho Vandals men's basketball players
Illinois State Redbirds men's basketball coaches
Iowa State Cyclones men's basketball coaches
People from Chicago
Loyola Ramblers men's basketball coaches
Missouri Tigers men's basketball coaches
SMU Mustangs men's basketball coaches
Southern Illinois Salukis men's basketball coaches
Texas A&M Aggies men's basketball coaches
Year of birth missing (living people)